The R407 is a Regional Route in South Africa that connects Willowmore with Prince Albert Road and the N1 via Klaarstroom and Prince Albert.

External links
 Routes Travel Info

References

Regional Routes in the Eastern Cape
Regional Routes in the Western Cape